It's Alive! is the only album released by The New Cars. The album features fifteen live tracks, twelve of which are songs known as being performed by the original Cars. The remaining two, "I Saw the Light" and "Open My Eyes", were popularized by New Cars member Todd Rundgren ("Open My Eyes" was originally performed by Rundgren's earlier garage rock group, Nazz). The album ends with three new studio tracks, recorded especially for this release.

Critical reception
It's Alive! was met with "mixed or average" reviews from critics. At Metacritic, which assigns a weighted average rating out of 100 to reviews from mainstream publications, this release received an average score of 54 based on 8 reviews.

In a review for AllMusic, critic reviewer Stephen Thomas Erlewine wrote: "It's Alive functions as a good appetizer for the tour: it's not earth-shaking, but it's far better than nearly any other reunion of this kind." At Pitchfork, Mark Hogan explained: "The first hour or so of It's Alive is perfect for Cars fans so diehard they'd not only pay for a live album of songs they mostly already own, but a live album 20 years after the fact with only two original members and a different lead singer."

Track listing

Personnel
Todd Rundgren – lead vocals, rhythm guitar
Elliot Easton – lead guitar, background vocals
Greg Hawkes – keyboards, background vocals
Kasim Sulton – bass guitar, background vocals, lead vocals on "Drive"
Prairie Prince – drums, percussion (tracks 1-15 and 17)
Kenny Aronoff – drums (tracks 16 and 18)

References

2006 debut albums
2006 live albums
The New Cars albums
Eleven Seven Label Group albums
Albums produced by Todd Rundgren